The 2014–15 Damehåndboldligaen (known as the Boxer Dameligaen for sponsorship reasons) is the 79th season of the Damehåndboldligaen, Denmark's premier Handball league.

Team information 

The following 12 clubs compete in the Damehåndboldligaen during the 2014–15 season:

Personnel and kits
Following is the list of clubs competing in 2014–15 Damehåndboldligaen, with their manager, captain, kit manufacturer and shirt sponsor.

Regular season

Standings

Results

Championship playoffs

Quarterfinal

Semifinal

Bronze match

Final

Relegation playoff

Group 1

W1D= Women's 1st DivisionDHL= Damehåndboldligaen

Group 2

W1D= Women's 1st DivisionDHL= Damehåndboldligaen

All Star Team
Goalkeeper:  Sabine Englert (FCM)
Left Wing:  Ann Grete Nørgaard (THH)
Left Back:  Jette Hansen (SIL)
Centre Back:  Nycke Groot (FCM)
Pivot:  Sarah Iversen (HCO)
Right Back:  Anne Cecilie De La Cour (SIL)
Right Wing:  Trine Østergaard Jensen (FCM)

Top goalscorers
Statistics.

Number of teams by regions

References

External links
 Danish Handball Federaration 

2014–15 domestic handball leagues
Handboldligaen
Handboldligaen